Wolfgang Haber (born 13 September 1925 in Datteln, Germany) is a biologist who helped establish the field of landscape ecology.

Life 
Haber studied Botany, Zoology, Chemistry, and Geography at the University of Münster, University of Munich, University of Basel, University of Stuttgart, and University of Hohenheim. From 1957 to 1962 he was a research assistant for Heinrich Walter in Hohenheim, then from 1962 to 1966 a curator and deputy director of the Museum of Natural History, Münster. From 1966 he was head of the newly founded Institute for Landscape Management at TU Munich in Weihenstephan (Freising), which he later renamed the Chair for Landscape Ecology. He held this chair until his retirement in 1993.

He researched fundamental questions of general and theoretical ecology; the application of ecology in land use, in particular in nature conservation, agricultural use, and land consolidation; the development, planning, and support of nature reserves, protected habitats, and natural and national parks; ecosystem research and modeling; and ecologically oriented planning.

Haber influenced the scientific and environmental policy development of nature conservation in Germany and internationally. He took a leading role in the founding of biotope mapping and the construction of the first German national park (Bavarian Forest National Park). He has pioneered teaching and research since the 1960s on ecological principles of nature conservation, state and landscape management, and landscape planning.

Haber was a member of the Advisory Board for Nature Conservation and Landscape Management at the Federal Ministry of Food and Agriculture, Germany (moved in 1986 to the Federal Ministry for the Environment, Nature Conservation and Nuclear Safety). From 1979 to 1990 he was the president of the Society for Ecology, the association of ecologists of German-speaking countries. In 1985 he was the Chairman of the Council of Experts on Environmental Issues of the Federal Government (SRU). From 1990 to 1996 he was the President of the International Association of Ecology (Intecol), the umbrella organization of national scientific ecology associations. Since 1980, he has been a member of the German Council for Provincial Administration, and from 1991 to 2003 he was also its spokesman.

In 1993, Haber was awarded the first environmental prize of the Federal Foundation for the Environment. For his scientific achievements he received numerous other awards, among them the Order of Merit of the Federal Republic of Germany first class (1986), the Bavarian Order of Merit (1973), and the Bavarian Maximilian Order for Science and Art.

Research
In the course of his decades of work, Haber has repeatedly dealt with the state of ecology in society and research. In his 2011 work The Uncomfortable Truths of Ecology – A Sustainability Perspective for the 21st Century he argues that "sustainability can only be achieved if we do not transfigure ecology." Haber gives mystifying images of the essence of man and a clear rejection of nature: in his opinion, the path to a sustainable future can only be achieved if we look at reality and focus on the key problems of the 21st century. He sees this in the finitude of resources and immense population growth. He calls on people to understand and accept these factual processes as human actions. In doing so, he ties in with a part of the human-ecological perspectives of Hans Carl von Carlowitz.

Publications 
Wolfgang Haber: The uncomfortable truths of ecology. Oekom Verlag 2010.  (also published in English)
Konstanze Schönthaler, Wolfgang Haber: Concept for integrated environmental monitoring. Environmental Protection Agency, Berlin 1998.
Wolfgang Haber: Sustainable management of soils. Initiative for an international soil concession. South German Newspaper , Munich 1999.
Wolfgang Haber: Quantification of space-specific development goals for nature conservation. Leaving the ARL, Hannover 1993
Wolfgang Haber: Ecological Principles of Environmental Protection. Economica publishing house, Bonn 1993.
Haber, Wolfgang / Jürgen Salzwedel (Eds.): Environmental Problems of Agriculture. Specialist Ecology. Edited by the Council of Environmental Experts. JB Metzler-Poeschel, Stuttgart, 1993.
Wolfgang Haber: Ecosystem Research Berchtesgaden. Research Report 101 04 040/04, UBA-FB 86–114. Berlin 1990.
Wolfgang Haber: Nature conservation and land development, demands of ecology. With the introduction of Carl Friedrich von Weizsäcker. Second edition, Callwey, Munich 1974.
Wolfgang Haber: Nature Conservation and Land Development – Demands of Ecology. DP system adernach 1972.

References

1925 births
Living people
German ecologists
People from Datteln
Officers Crosses of the Order of Merit of the Federal Republic of Germany